The 2001 Canadian Mixed Curling Championship was held January 6–14 at The Colosseum in Weyburn, Saskatchewan.

Teams

Standings

Results

Draw 1

Draw 2

Draw 3

Draw 4

Draw 5

Draw 6

Draw 7

Draw 8

Draw 9

Draw 10

Draw 11

Draw 12

Draw 13

Draw 14

Draw 15

Draw 16

Draw 17

Tiebreakers

Tiebreaker #1

Tiebreaker #2

Playoffs

1 vs. 2

3 vs. 4

Semifinal

Final

External links
Event statistics

References

Canadian Mixed Curling Championship
Curling in Saskatchewan
Mixed Curling Championship
Canadian Mixed Curling Championship
Weyburn
Canadian Mixed Curling Championship